Theddlethorpe All Saints or West Theddlethorpe is a village and civil parish about  from Louth, in the East Lindsey district, in the county of Lincolnshire, England. In 2011 the parish had a population of 165. The parish touches Gayton Le Marsh, Great Carlton, Saltfleetby and Theddlethorpe St. Helen. Theddlethorpe All Saints shares a parish council with Theddlethorpe St Helen.

Landmarks 
There are 4 listed buildings in Theddlethorpe All Saints. Theddlethorpe All Saints has a church called All Saints Church.
Hall Farmhouse is a Grade II listed 16th-century red-brick house, altered about 1680 with more alterations in the late 18th and 19th centuries.

Within the parish there is a medieval moat, extant in 1963 but now only visible as cropmarks. A hearth tile bearing the arms of the Angevin family was found when excavation took place in the moated enclosure near Theddlethorpe All Saints church. The house within the moat was called Keleshall.

History 
The name "Theddlethorpe" means 'Theodlac's outlying farm/settlement'.

See also 
 Theddlethorpe

References

External links 
 Parish council

Villages in Lincolnshire
Civil parishes in Lincolnshire
East Lindsey District